The 2022 Oregon Ducks football team represented the University of Oregon during the 2022 NCAA Division I FBS football season. The team was led by first-year head coach Dan Lanning. The Ducks played their home games at Autzen Stadium in Eugene, Oregon, and competed as members of the Pac-12 Conference. The Ducks bid for the Pac 12 Championship would have been clinched if they won on November 26 against Oregon State or if Utah lost to Colorado (which required UCLA to beat California). However, Oregon lost the game, meaning they had to rely on Washington losing to Washington State to avoid a three-way tie between them, Washington (who beat Oregon), and Utah, as the tiebreaker for teams that had mutually beat each other favored Utah, which came to pass when Washington won later that night, allowing Utah to reach the Pac 12 championship.

Previous season

The 2021 Oregon Ducks football team began the year with three wins out of conference, including the program's first ever win against Ohio State. Despite a surprise loss to Stanford in early October, the Ducks were the Pac-12's top performing team into late November and were projected by multiple outlets to appear in a New Year's Six bowl. However, the Ducks had a disastrous 31-point loss at Utah on November 20, followed two weeks later with a 28-point loss to Utah in the Pac-12 Championship Game. Oregon ended up playing Oklahoma in the Valero Alamo Bowl, which the Ducks lost 32-47. Oregon finished the year 10-4 and ranked 22 in the AP Poll.

Off-season

Departures

Staff Changes

Following the 2021 regular season, then-head coach Mario Cristobal departed Oregon for the University of Miami. The rest of Oregon's staff remained through the Alamo Bowl before departing as well; none of the 2021 coaching staff remained for the 2022 season.

2022 NFL draft
 
 
Due to COVID-19, the NCAA granted an extra year of eligibility to all college athletes, and all could have returned for another year at Oregon. Several Ducks declared for the 2022 NFL Draft, but Kayvon Thibodeaux was the lone Ducks player selected. After the conclusion of the draft, a number of other Ducks players reached free-agent deals with NFL teams.

Undrafted NFL free agents

Additions

Recruiting class

  
  

 

  
 
 
  
  
  
  

 
*= 247Sports Composite rating; ratings are out of 1.00. (five stars= 1.00–.98, four stars= .97–.90, three stars= .80–.89, two stars= .79–.70, no stars= <70)
†= Despite being rated as a four and five star recruit by ESPN, On3.com, Rivals.com and 247Sports.com, TBD received a four-five star 247Sports Composite rating.
Δ= Left the Oregon program following signing but prior to the 2022 season.

Preseason

Pac-12 Media Day
The Pac-12 Media Day was held in July, 2022 in Hollywood, California. Whereas in previous years the media would vote on division standings and conference championship game result, beginning in 2022 the divisions were used purely for scheduling purposes. The conference championship game will have the two teams with the best conference records, regardless of division, and the media vote reflects that change.

Preseason All-Pac-12 teams

Schedule

Rankings

Personnel

Roster

Source and player details:

Coaching staff

Game summaries

vs No. 3 Georgia

vs Eastern Washington (FCS)

vs No. 12 BYU

at Washington State

vs Stanford

at Arizona

vs UCLA

at California

at Colorado

vs No. 25 Washington

vs No. 10 Utah

at No. 21 Oregon State

vs North Carolina (Holiday Bowl)

Statistics

Team

Individual leaders

Offense

Defense
 

Key: POS: Position, SOLO: Solo Tackles, AST: Assisted Tackles, TOT: Total Tackles, TFL: Tackles-for-loss, SACK: Quarterback Sacks, INT: Interceptions, BU: Passes Broken Up, PD: Passes Defended, QBH: Quarterback Hits, FR: Fumbles Recovered, FF: Forced Fumbles, BLK: Kicks or Punts Blocked, SAF: Safeties, TD : Touchdown

Special teams

Scoring
 
Oregon vs Non-Conference Opponents

 
Oregon vs Pac-12 Opponents

 
Oregon vs All Opponents

After the season

Awards and honors

References

Oregon
Oregon Ducks football seasons
Holiday Bowl champion seasons
Oregon Ducks football